Salford is a village and civil parish about  west of Chipping Norton, Oxfordshire. The 2011 Census recorded the parish's population as 356.

Parish church
The Church of England parish church of Saint Mary the Virgin was largely Norman until the Oxford Diocesan architect, the Gothic Revivalist G.E. Street almost completely rebuilt it in 1854. The font and parts of two doorways are among the few Norman features that Street retained. Street probably rebuilt the bell tower, but its Decorated Gothic bell openings survive.  The tower has a ring of five bells, all of which were cast in 1687 by Matthew I Bagley and Henry II Bagley of Chacombe, Northamptonshire.  The ecclesiastical parish is part of the Team Benefice of Chipping Norton, along with the parishes of Chastleton, Chipping Norton, Churchill, Cornwell, Daylesford, Kingham, Little Compton, Little Rollright and Over Norton.

Amenities

Salford has a public house, The Salford Inn serving home made food and real ales with accommodation and beer garden.

References

Sources

External links

Salford Parish Council

Civil parishes in Oxfordshire
Villages in Oxfordshire
West Oxfordshire District